Jordan Firstman (born July 8, 1991) is a writer, producer, and comedian living in Los Angeles, California. He is known for the short films Men Don't Whisper (2017) and the Sundance-nominated Call Your Father (2016). Firstman rose to prominence for his short skits, called Impressions, shared on Instagram Live during the 2020 Coronavirus pandemic. He is openly gay.

Career
In 2016, Firstman wrote and starred in Call Your Father, a satirical short-film exploring the ups-and-downs of an inter-generational gay couple. At the same time, he was a writer for the television series Search Party. The following year, Firstman and co-writer Charles Rogers, made Men Don't Whisper, a comedic short film about an emasculated gay couple who try to regain their masculinity by seducing several women. The film was screened at Sundance and South by Southwest, and was selected as a Vimeo Staff Pick Premiere.

In early 2020, Firstman wrote an ode sung by the Gay Men's Chorus of Los Angeles, celebrating gay representation in film, as well as Laura Dern at the 2020 Independent Spirit Awards. During the COVID-19 pandemic, Firstman began posting videos to Instagram of various impressions, such as "the town gossip who has no more gossip during quarantine", "summer 2020", "banana bread's publicist" and "all the clothes people are not wearing right now". His comedic impersonations have been met with positive response from internet fans and celebrities alike, including Ariana Grande, Katy Perry, and Chrissy Teigen. Actress Ruby McCollister has said of the skits, "You're putting a home base to the meme", by incorporating video, text, and creator all at once. For Thom Browne's SS2021 show, which was set during the future 2132 Olympics on the Moon, Firstman and model Grace Mahary roleplayed as commentators while models walked down the Los Angeles Coliseum, an Art Deco relic where the 1932 Olympics were held.

In 2022, he appeared in the Marvel Cinematic Universe series Ms. Marvel, which aired on Disney+.

Filmography

Film

Television

As producer

References

External links
 
 

Living people
1991 births
American gay actors
American gay writers
American actors
American writers
American comedians
American LGBT comedians